State Road 357 (NM 357) is a state highway in the US state of New Mexico. NM 357's eastern terminus is in the city of Artesia at NM 229 (NM 229), and the  western terminus is 26th street in Artesia. NM 357 is also known as Richey Avenue.

Major intersections

See also

References

357
Transportation in Eddy County, New Mexico